The Beaver River is a river in Durham Region in Central Ontario, Canada. It is part of the Great Lakes Basin, and is a tributary of Lake Simcoe. The river's drainage basin is mostly in Durham Region with the remaining portion in the city of Kawartha Lakes; the entire watershed is under the auspices of the Lake Simcoe Region Conservation Authority.

Course
The river begins at an unnamed pond in Scugog on the Oak Ridges Moraine and heads north, passing briefly through Uxbridge before returning to Scugog. The river continues north and its valley becomes largely marshy, paralleled by the now defunct Toronto and Nipissing Railway line to Coboconk. The river passes under Ontario Highway 12/Ontario Highway 7 and enters Brock. At the community of Cannington, the river turns northwest and reaches its mouth at Lake Simcoe at the community of Beaverton.

Tributaries
Vrooman Creek (left)

See also
List of rivers of Ontario

References

Sources

Rivers of the Regional Municipality of Durham
Tributaries of Lake Simcoe